Political Party "Third Force" is a political party in Ukraine that was created in 2005 by Vasyl Havryliuk.

External links
 Party profile at the Center of Political Information

Political parties in Ukraine